Torun Lian (born 15 January 1956) is a Norwegian playwright, film director and novelist. She made her literary début in 1988 with the collection Tre skuespill, for which she was awarded the Tarjei Vesaas' debutantpris. In 1995 she was awarded with the Nordic Children's Book Prize. Among her films are Bare skyer beveger stjernene from 1998, and Ikke naken, ikke kledt (engl. The Color of Milk) from 2000.

Bibliography 
The titles are in Norwegian:

Tre skuespill – play (1988)
Den som beveger seg langsomt beveger seg – play (1989) 
Frida – ungdomsbok (1990)
Frida – med hjertet i hånden – youth novel (1991), collection of the Frida books published in 2000
Lengtere – play (1994)
Bare skyer beveger stjernene – youth novel (1994)
Ikke naken ikke kledt – youth novel (2000)
Adam den tredje i fjerde – children's book (2005)
Undrene i vår familie – novel (2008)
Alice Andersen – children's book (2014)
Reserveprinsesse Andersen – children's book (2015)
Alice svømmer ikke – children's book (2016)
Alice og alt du ikke vet og godt er det – children's book (2017)

Prizes 
Tarjei Vesaas' debutantpris 1988, for Tre skuespill (Three plays)
Amanda Award for Best Screenplay (1990), for the TV-series Frida
Prix Jeunesse, for the TV-series Frida 
Nordische Filmtage, main prize (1991), for Frida med hjertet i hånden
Amanda Award for Best Screenplay (1991), for Frida med hjertet i hånden
Amanda Award for Best Film (1991), for Frida med hjertet i hånden
Nordic Children's Book Prize (1995), for Bare skyer beveger stjernene
Amanda Award for Best Film (1998), for Bare skyer beveger stjernene
Beste nordiske barnefilm (1998), for Bare skyer beveger stjernene
Filmkriterprisen (1998), for Bare skyer beveger stjernene
Telenor Culture Award (1999)
Sonja Hagemanns Children's and Youth Book Prize 2000, for Ikke naken ikke kledt
Ingmar Bergman Prize (2000)
 Amanda Prize for Best Screenplay 2010, for Vegas

References

1956 births
Norwegian dramatists and playwrights
Norwegian film directors
Norwegian women film directors
Norwegian children's writers
Living people
Norwegian women children's writers
Norwegian women dramatists and playwrights